Choi Young-Jun (born 15 December 1991) is a South Korean football midfielder, who currently plays for Jeju United.

Club career
Choi was one of Gyeongnam FC's draft picks for the 2011 season.   Choi made his professional debut on 5 May 2011, in a 2011 K-League Cup group match against Daejeon Citizen.

Club career statistics

1Includes K League Promotion-Relegation Playoffs.

Honours

Club 
Gyeongnam FC:
 K League 2 : 2017
 K League 1 : 2021

Individual 
 K League 1 Best XI: 2018

References

External links

1991 births
Living people
Association football midfielders
South Korean footballers
Konkuk University alumni
K League 1 players
K League 2 players
Gyeongnam FC players
Ansan Mugunghwa FC players
Jeonbuk Hyundai Motors players
Pohang Steelers players
Jeju United FC players